Built in 1931 and formerly known as the Canada Permanent Trust Building in Toronto, 320 Bay Street was designed by the architect Henry Sproatt. It is an 18-storey office building located in the heart of downtown Toronto. 

Menkes Developments Ltd. started a major restoration of the building in 2021, improving the quality and service of the space, while preserving the integrity of the structure's history and architectural elements. Menkes plans to enhance the 1930s façade, and has exciting plans for a street level reimagination of the Building. The revitalization of the 300,000 square foot space will include significant electrical and mechanical upgrades.

Heritage Information
The building is designated under Part IV of the Ontario Heritage Act since November 26, 1975. There is also a heritage easement agreement on the building, Registered C440805, since January 7, 1988. The building has a heritage designation plaque to inform the public, placed in 1978.

Per the official designation: "The Canada Permannent Trust Building, 320 Bay Street at Adelaide 
Street West (SW), 1929-30 by F. Hilton Wilkes & Mackenzie Waters; Mathers & Haldenby, Associates. Sproatt & Rolph, Consultants.
 
The Canada Permanent Trust Building is designated to be of architectural value as being one of 
the finest highrise bank buildings of its period in Canada. Designed using the simplified classical forms of the Style Moderne, it combines an emphasis on its vertical height appropriate to its basic form, with the impressive vaulted banking hall, characteristic of bank 
buildings at the beginning of the Century. The building is also important as a part of the Bay 
Street canyon of high-rise buildings that has come to be regarded as symbolic of Toronto's financial quarter."

Company Information
The Canada Permanent Trust building was purchased by Menkes Developments Ltd. in partnership with TD Greystone Asset Management in January 2019 and is now known as The Permanent.

References

External links
 
 
 CIBC Mellon

Art Deco architecture in Canada
Skyscrapers in Toronto
Historic bank buildings in Canada
Office buildings completed in 1930
Skyscraper office buildings in Canada